This is a survey of the postage stamps and postal history of Trinidad and Tobago.

Trinidad and Tobago lies northeast of Venezuela and south of Grenada in the Lesser Antilles. Trinidad and Tobago was a Spanish colony from the times of Christopher Columbus to 1802, when it was ceded to Britain. The country obtained independence in 1962.

Lady McLeod stamps 

The first stamps of Trinidad were the famous Lady McLeod, a private local post, stamps of 1847.

First Trinidad stamps 

The first definitives for Trinidad were issued in 1851.

Tobago stamps 

Tobago used stamps of Trinidad from 1860. Stamps of Tobago were not issued until 1879. Tobago again used stamps of Trinidad from 1896.

Trinidad and Tobago issues 
Stamps inscribed "Trinidad & Tobago" were first issued in 1913 after the integration of the postal administrations of Trinidad and Tobago.

Independence 

Trinidad and Tobago issued stamps as an independence state on 31 August 1962.

See also 
List of people on stamps of Trinidad and Tobago
Revenue stamps of Trinidad and Tobago

References

External links
 The Trinidad and Tobago Philatelic Page

Further reading 
 Aleong, Joe Chin and Edward B. Proud. The Postal History of Trinidad & Tobago. Heathfield: Proud-Bailey Co., 1997, 520 pages, 
 Ford, Peter C., Charles Freeland and Edward Barrow. Tobago: The Philatelic Story of a Small Island. Javea, Alicante: British West Indies Study Circle, 2014, 150 pages, 
Marriott, John B, Michael Medlicott and Reuben A. Ramkissoon. Trinidad: A Philatelic History to 1913. Alicante: British West Indies Study Circle in conjunction with the British Caribbean Philatelic Study Group, 2010, 359 pages, 
 Wike, R.G. Airmails of Trinidad and Tobago. Congleton: British West Indies Study Circle, 1999, 214 pages, 

History of Trinidad and Tobago
Postal system of Trinidad and Tobago
Philately of Trinidad and Tobago